Christian Telch (born 9 January 1988) is a German footballer who plays as a defender for Rheinlandliga club SV Gimbsheim.

External links

Profile at FuPa.net

1988 births
Living people
Sportspeople from Mainz
German footballers
1. FSV Mainz 05 II players
Kickers Offenbach players
Rot-Weiss Essen players
SVN Zweibrücken players
SV Eintracht Trier 05 players
FC 08 Homburg players
3. Liga players
Regionalliga players
Association football fullbacks
Association football midfielders
Footballers from Rhineland-Palatinate